Legion of Substitute Heroes is a group of fictional characters in the future of the DC Comics universe. The "Subs", as they are often called, are a group of rejected applicants to the Legion of Super-Heroes who band together, hoping to prove to the Legion that their powers are not as useless as the Legionnaires claim. They first appeared in Adventure Comics #306 (March 1963) and were created by Edmond Hamilton and John Forte.

The group were depicted as reasonably effective superheroes until Keith Giffen, during his tenure as Legion writer, began depicting the team as something of a joke. The Subs regain some respect when founding member Polar Boy joins the main Legion, and a new Legion of Substitute Heroes is formed.

Publication history
The Legion of Substitute Heroes is founded by Polar Boy, Night Girl, Stone Boy, Fire Lad, and Chlorophyll Kid, five young heroes whose powers are not sufficient to earn them membership in the Legion of Super-Heroes — Stone Boy, for example, is completely immobile when using his power. After receiving a Legion flight belt as a consolation prize, the five disconsolate teenagers decide to form a group that can pinch hit for the Legion. After several failures as a team, the Subs save the Earth from an invasion by Plant Men while the Legion is off planet fighting a decoy armada of robot spaceships.

At first operating in secrecy, the Legion of Substitute Heroes is gradually recognized by the real Legion as a valuable asset, most notably after the assault on the Citadel of Throon when the regular Legionnaires are all defeated and it is left to Polar Boy and Night Girl to lead an effective attack and end the siege. Later recruits to the Legion of Substitute Heroes include Antennae Lad, Color Kid, Double-Header, Infectious Lass, Porcupine Pete, Dream Girl, and Star Boy. The team fell into disuse during the Bronze Age of Comic Books since their simple, young-readers-oriented concept left them out-of-place in the dark, socially relevant stories of the era.

The Legion of Substitute Heroes were first presented as a starring feature in DC Comics Presents #59 (July 1983). Writer/artist Keith Giffen had been asked to do a story featuring the villain Ambush Bug, and decided that the Legion of Substitute Heroes would be appropriate heroes to pit against the villain since they were somewhat "goofy" and obscure enough that he could do what he wanted with them without fear of arousing controversy. Exceptionally good sales on the humor-driven issue led to DC publishing a Legion of Substitute Heroes Special on April Fool's Day, 1985. Again written and drawn by Giffen, the Legion of Substitute Heroes Special became regarded as a seminal work, and Giffen was emboldened to employ the issue's boundary-pushing, often metafictional comedy in his later works.

After a colorful, if not exactly impressive, career, the Substitute Heroes are disbanded by Polar Boy. Polar Boy goes on to attain full membership in the Legion of Super-Heroes. Many of the remaining members eventually join the Legion as well during the "Five Year Gap". Shortly before the "Five Year Gap", a new Legion of Substitute Heroes is formed. It consists of former Legion of Super-Heroes members Cosmic Boy, Bouncing Boy, and Duo Damsel, as well as Night Girl, a new Karate Kid (Myg of Lythyl), and Comet Queen.

During the events of Legion of Super-Heroes (vol. 4), the "Subs" come into their own as an insurgent group that helps the Terran resistance to the Dominators. Here, old Subs Fire Lad, Stone Boy, Chlorophyl Kid, Color Kid, and Porcupine Pete, are joined by new allies such as Ron-Karr and Grinn.

Following the Zero Hour reboot, the Subs appear in Legionnaires #43 during Legion tryouts. Infectious Lass, Fire Lad, and Color Kid are on the cover, while Stone Boy, Chlorophyll Kid, Night Girl, and Polar Boy all try out.

In the Legion Worlds one-shot focusing on Braal, Cosmic Boy along with Invisible Kid, Leviathan, and Chuck Taine call themselves the "Legion of Subs"; the word 'Subs' is short for "subterfuge".

In the Legion series launched in 2004, Polar Boy and Chlorophyll Kid (renamed Plant Lad) appear as a part of the new Wanderers led by Mekt Ranzz. This version of Polar Boy can only slow molecular movement. Night Girl applies for membership in the Legion but is rejected and made a reserve member (as part of the "Legion Reserve"), along with Sizzle, an energy manipulator, and Turtle, a strong and durable alien.

Versions of Infectious Lass, Polar Boy, Night Girl, Stone Boy, Fire Lad, and Chlorophyll Kid similar in appearance to their Pre-Crisis on Infinite Earths counterparts appear in the Tales of the Unexpected limited series and the Superman and the Legion of Super-Heroes story arc in Action Comics.

In part five of the Superman and the Legion of Super-Heroes story arc in Action Comics, Fire Lad, Stone Boy, Chlorophyll Kid, and Rainbow Girl are called in to help battle the Justice League of Earth, a tyrannical, alien-hating association formed out of super-powered beings also rejected by the Legion; other Legion members draw a distinction between how the Substitutes had genuine power issues that stopped them from becoming full members while the super-beings who joined the Justice League of Earth were rejected because of their darker psychological issues. After the villainous group is defeated, the Subs claim their satellite base as their own.

At an early point in their timeline, the Substitutes team up with the Inferior Five in a failed attempt to steal the Legion's thunder and destroy a primeval black hole.

In other media

Legion of Super Heroes
Characters from the Legion of Substitute Heroes first appeared in the Legion of Super Heroes episode entitled "Lightning Storm", and then again in the episode "The Substitutes", which focused completely on them. They are portrayed as a mix of sympathetic and comedic characters who are determined to be heroes but not entirely aware of their limits.

The Legion of Substitute Heroes in the animated series consists of:
 Porcupine Pete – portrayed as something of a "mother's boy" who is not always good with his powers, but is determined to be a hero and has a definite sense of responsibility. Pete easily forgets that his quills can hurt others. He is the unofficial leader of the team. Voiced by James Arnold Taylor. 
 Chlorophyll Kid – portrayed as a classic nebbish, but clever at using his limited powers, such as creating cacti to distract an enemy with human-like silhouettes. When pushed, he will take risks to protect others. Voiced by Alexander Polinsky. 
 Stone Boy – portrayed as highly intelligent. He once uses a fall in his stone form to strike an enemy, yet speaks little. In fact, his companions actually were surprised when he did speak up, suggesting that they thought he was mute. His ability to use his stone form ranges from ineffectual to clever, perhaps because he does not have the sense of humor to realize when he is doing something silly. He also at times seems to forget to change back to flesh. He seems to have some small knowledge of science, which he shares with the team, giving an excellent insight on Starfinger's Ionosphere-gobbling space-worms and how to stop them. Voiced by Yuri Lowenthal. 
 Color Kid – portrayed as energetic, enthusiastic, often ignorant of danger, and a bit flamboyant and campy. He has an excellent eye for color, but has not caught on entirely how limited his powers are. His most noteworthy use of his abilities is to conceal an obstacle to trip a villain and conceal his fellow heroes. Voiced by James Arnold Taylor. 
 Infectious Lass – portrayed as withdrawn and seems to suffer from a mild asthma-like condition and sounds permanently congested, often sniffling during speech. Her powers involve creating an infectious slime, but it seems limited to creating a quick, mild cold. Voiced by Kari Wahlgren.

In addition, Antennae Lad, Polar Boy, Fire Lad, Double-Header, and Night Girl all appeared in cameos in both episodes as prospective members of the Legion.

The Substitute Heroes were seen briefly in a battalion during "Sundown" Part 2, although never actually participating in the fight against the Sun-Eater.

In the second-season (and series) finale, "Dark Victory", the Substitute Heroes and other previously rejected auditions from the first season are shown among the Legion during Cosmic Boy's speech in part one.  Polar Boy is briefly seen in part two.

Smallville
In the Smallville episode "Legion", Cosmic Boy tells Lightning Lad that he is acting like a Sub when he asks Clark to autograph the first baseball Clark had ever hit, claiming it was for his sister.

References

External links
 
 Legion of Substitute Heroes at Cosmic Teams!
 Legion of Substitute Heroes at the Legion of Super-Heroes Clubhouse
 Hero History: The Legion of Substitute Heroes
 The Unofficial Legion of Substitute Heroes Biography

Characters created by Edmond Hamilton
Characters created by John Forte
DC Comics extraterrestrial superheroes
Legion of Super-Heroes